İdealtepe railway station is a railway station in Maltepe, Istanbul. Located along Turgut Özal Boulevard and the Sea of Marmara, it was a station on the Haydarpaşa suburban commuter line from 1966 to 2013. The station platforms were rebuilt and expanded for the Marmaray commuter rail system opened on 12 March 2019. Before its demolition, İdealtepe had two side platforms with two tracks. The new station have an island platform with two tracks as well as a third track for express trains.

İdealtepe station was built in 1966 by the Turkish State Railways.

References

Railway stations in Istanbul Province
Railway stations opened in 1966
1966 establishments in Turkey
Maltepe, Istanbul
Marmaray